The cycling competition at the 2018 Central American and Caribbean Games was held from 20 to 29 July. The BMX events were held at Villa Carolina, the mountain biking events were held at the Pista Pelicanos, the road cycling events were held at Dapa Mall, Palmira and Buga and the track cycling events were held at the Velódromo Alcides Nieto Patiño

Medal summary

Road events

Track events

Mountain events

BMX events

Medal table

References

External links
 
 
 
 

2018 Central American and Caribbean Games events
2018
Qualification tournaments for the 2019 Pan American Games
2018 in track cycling
2018 in road cycling
2018 in BMX
2018 in mountain biking